Giovanni Arrivabene (24 June 1787 – 11 January 1881) was an Italian-Belgian politician and economist.

Life
Arrivabene was born in 1787 in Mantua, which in 1815 became part of the Austrian-ruled Kingdom of Lombardy–Venetia. He opposed Austrian rule in Italy, and in 1821 was arrested on suspicion of being a member of the revolutionary secret society of Carbonari, but was released for lack of evidence. He went into voluntary exile, first in France, then in England (where he became friends with James Mill, Thomas Tooke and John Ramsay McCulloch), and finally in Belgium, where he associated with Sylvain Van de Weyer, Félix de Mérode, Adolphe Quetelet, and Édouard Ducpétiaux. Arrivabene bought a house in Brussels in 1829, and in 1834 was among the founders of the Free University of Brussels.

He was naturalised as a Belgian citizen in 1841, and in 1845 he was appointed to a royal commission on improving the condition of workers. From 1850 to 1854 he served as a provincial councillor for the Province of Brabant. He was a prolific though not particularly original writer in the field of political economy, and a founding member and first president of the Belgian Society for Political Economy (established 1855).

In 1860, following the Austrian defeat at the Battle of Solferino, Arrivabene was appointed to the Senate of the Kingdom of Sardinia. For his remaining years he divided his time between Italy and Belgium. He was a recipient of the Order of Saints Maurice and Lazarus. He has been the Prefect of the Royal Virgilian Academy (1867-1881).

He died in Mantua in 1881.

References

External links
 
 

1787 births
1881 deaths
19th-century Italian politicians
19th-century Belgian politicians
Italian economists
Members of the Senate of the Kingdom of Sardinia
Recipients of the Order of Saints Maurice and Lazarus